The following is a list of countries by largest island. It does not include divided islands; several of the world's largest islands, such as New Guinea, Borneo, Ireland and Hispaniola, are divided between two or three states. This list only includes islands fully owned by a single country. Similarly, many of the world's largest islands belong to a handful of states, such as Canada and Indonesia; only the largest island of each country is listed here.

List

See also
 List of countries by number of islands
 List of islands by area

References

Lists of countries by geography
Lists of islands